George Yorke Hubble (28 November 1858 – 22 March 1906) was an Australian politician who was a member of the Legislative Assembly of Western Australia from 1897 to 1901 (excluding a brief gap in 1899), representing the seat of Gascoyne.

Hubble was born in Bendigo, Victoria, where his father had arrived during the Victorian gold rush. He came to Western Australia in the 1880s, initially living in the South West, but by 1890 was a merchant in Fremantle. Hubble eventually went into partnership with David Symon (another MP), establishing the firm Symon, Hammond, & Hubble. In 1896, he moved to Carnarvon (the largest town in the Gascoyne region), where he opened a general store. Hubble was elected to parliament at the 1897 general election, replacing the retiring Robert Sholl. However, in June 1899, he was declared bankrupt, meaning he had to resign his seat. He was re-elected unopposed at the resulting by-election, but chose not to re-contest his seat at the 1901 general election. Hubble left Carnarvon in 1903 to live in Perth. He died in East Perth in March 1906, aged 47, having committed suicide by cutting his neck with a razor. Hubble had married twice, and had one son by his first wife, who was a daughter of William Silas Pearse.

Notes

References

1858 births
1906 suicides
Australian merchants
Australian politicians who committed suicide
Members of the Western Australian Legislative Assembly
People from Bendigo
Suicides by sharp instrument in Australia
Suicides in Western Australia
19th-century Australian politicians
19th-century Australian businesspeople